Nevada was admitted to the Union on October 31, 1864 and has been represented in the United States Senate by 28 people. Its current U.S. senators are Democrats Catherine Cortez Masto (Class 3, serving since 2017) and Jacky Rosen (Class 1, serving since 2019). Nevada has been represented by 14 Republicans and 14 Democrats. Harry Reid was Nevada's longest-serving senator (1987–2017).

List of senators

|- style="height:2em"
! rowspan=6 | 1
| rowspan=6 align=left | William Stewart
| rowspan=6  | Republican
| rowspan=6 nowrap | Feb 1, 1865 –Mar 3, 1875
| rowspan=3 | Elected in 1865.
| rowspan=3 | 1
| 
| rowspan=2 | 1
| rowspan=2 | Elected in 1865.
| rowspan=5 nowrap | Feb 1, 1865 –Mar 3, 1873
| rowspan=5  | Republican
| rowspan=5 align=right | James W. Nye
! rowspan=5 | 1

|- style="height:2em"
| 

|- style="height:2em"
| 
| rowspan=3 | 2
| rowspan=3 | Re-elected in 1867.Lost re-election.

|- style="height:2em"
| rowspan=3 | Re-elected in 1869.Retired.
| rowspan=3 | 2
| 

|- style="height:2em"
| 

|- style="height:2em"
| 
| rowspan=3 | 3
| rowspan=3 | Elected in 1873.
| rowspan=15 nowrap | Mar 4, 1873 –Mar 3, 1903
| rowspan=11  | Republican
| rowspan=15 align=right | John P. Jones
! rowspan=15 | 2

|- style="height:2em"
! rowspan=3 | 2
| rowspan=3 align=left | William Sharon
| rowspan=3  | Republican
| rowspan=3 nowrap | Mar 4, 1875 –Mar 3, 1881
| rowspan=3 | Elected in 1875.Retired or lost renomination.
| rowspan=3 | 3
| 

|- style="height:2em"
| 

|- style="height:2em"
| 
| rowspan=3 | 4
| rowspan=3 | Re-elected in 1879.

|- style="height:2em"
! rowspan=3 | 3
| rowspan=3 align=left | James Graham Fair
| rowspan=3  | Democratic
| rowspan=3 nowrap | Mar 4, 1881 –Mar 3, 1887
| rowspan=3 | Elected in 1881.Lost re-election.
| rowspan=3 | 3
| 

|- style="height:2em"
| 

|- style="height:2em"
| 
| rowspan=3 | 5
| rowspan=3 | Re-elected in 1885.

|- style="height:2em"
! rowspan=9 | 4
| rowspan=9 align=left | William Stewart
| rowspan=3  | Republican
| rowspan=9 nowrap | Mar 4, 1887 –Mar 3, 1905
| rowspan=3 | Elected in 1887.
| rowspan=3 | 4
| 

|- style="height:2em"
| 

|- style="height:2em"
| 
| rowspan=3 | 6
| rowspan=3 | Re-elected in 1891.

|- style="height:2em"
| rowspan=4  | Silver
| rowspan=3 | Re-elected in 1893.
| rowspan=3 | 5
| 

|- style="height:2em"
| 
| rowspan=3  | Silver

|- style="height:2em"
| 
| rowspan=3 | 7
| rowspan=3 | Re-elected in 1897.Retired.

|- style="height:2em"
| rowspan=3 | Re-elected in 1899.Retired.
| rowspan=3 | 6
| 

|- style="height:2em"
| rowspan=2  | Republican
| 
|  | Republican

|- style="height:2em"
| 
| rowspan=3 | 8
| rowspan=3 | Elected in 1903.
| rowspan=11 nowrap | Mar 4, 1903 –Dec 24, 1917
| rowspan=11  | Democratic
| rowspan=11 align=right | Francis G. Newlands
! rowspan=11 | 3

|- style="height:2em"
! rowspan=4 | 5
| rowspan=4 align=left | George S. Nixon
| rowspan=4  | Republican
| rowspan=4 nowrap | Mar 4, 1905 –June 5, 1912
| rowspan=3 | Elected in 1905.
| rowspan=3 | 7
| 

|- style="height:2em"
| 

|- style="height:2em"
| 
| rowspan=6 | 9
| rowspan=6 | Re-elected in 1909.

|- style="height:2em"
| Re-elected in 1911.Died.
| rowspan=6 | 8
| rowspan=4 

|- style="height:2em"
| colspan=3 | Vacant
| nowrap | June 5, 1912 –July 1, 1912
|  

|- style="height:2em"
! 6
| align=left | William A. Massey
|  | Republican
| nowrap | July 1, 1912 –Jan 29, 1913
| Appointed to continue Nixon's term.Lost election to finish Nixon's term.

|- style="height:2em"
! rowspan=17 | 7
| rowspan=17 align=left | Key Pittman
| rowspan=17  | Democratic
| rowspan=17 nowrap | Jan 29, 1913 –Nov 10, 1940
| rowspan=3 | Elected in 1913 to finish Nixon's term.

|- style="height:2em"
| 

|- style="height:2em"
| 
| rowspan=5 | 10
| rowspan=2 | Re-elected in 1914.Died.

|- style="height:2em"
| rowspan=5 | Elected in 1916 to full term.
| rowspan=5 | 9
| rowspan=3 

|- style="height:2em"
|  
| nowrap | Dec 24, 1917 –Jan 12, 1918
| colspan=3 | Vacant

|- style="height:2em"
| rowspan=2 | Appointed to continue Newlands's term.Elected in 1918 to finish Newlands's term.Lost election to full term.
| rowspan=2 nowrap | Jan 12, 1918 –Mar 3, 1921
| rowspan=2  | Democratic
| rowspan=2 align=right | Charles Henderson
! rowspan=2 | 4

|- style="height:2em"
| 

|- style="height:2em"
| 
| rowspan=3 | 11
| rowspan=3 | Elected in 1920.
| rowspan=6 nowrap | Mar 4, 1921 –Mar 3, 1933
| rowspan=6  | Republican
| rowspan=6 align=right | Tasker Oddie
! rowspan=6 | 5

|- style="height:2em"
| rowspan=3 | Re-elected in 1922.
| rowspan=3 | 10
| 

|- style="height:2em"
| 

|- style="height:2em"
| 
| rowspan=3 | 12
| rowspan=3 | Re-elected in 1926.Lost re-election.

|- style="height:2em"
| rowspan=3 | Re-elected in 1928.
| rowspan=3 | 11
| 

|- style="height:2em"
| 

|- style="height:2em"
| 
| rowspan=3 | 13
| rowspan=3 | Elected in 1932.
| rowspan=16 nowrap | Mar 4, 1933 –Sep 28, 1954
| rowspan=16  | Democratic
| rowspan=16 align=right | Pat McCarran
! rowspan=16 | 6

|- style="height:2em"
| rowspan=3 | Re-elected in 1934.Died, having been elected to the next term.
| rowspan=5 | 12
| 

|- style="height:2em"
| 

|- style="height:2em"
| rowspan=3 
| rowspan=6 | 14
| rowspan=6 | Re-elected in 1938.

|- style="height:2em"
| colspan=3 | Vacant
| nowrap | Nov 10, 1940 –Nov 27, 1940
|  

|- style="height:2em"
! rowspan=2 | 8
| rowspan=2 align=left | Berkeley L. Bunker
| rowspan=2  | Democratic
| rowspan=2 nowrap | Nov 27, 1940 –Dec 6, 1942
| Appointed to finish Pittman's term.

|- style="height:2em"
| Appointed to start Pittman's next term.Lost nomination to finish Pittman's next term.
| rowspan=6 | 13
| rowspan=2 

|- style="height:2em"
! rowspan=3 | 9
| rowspan=3 align=left | James G. Scrugham
| rowspan=3  | Democratic
| rowspan=3 nowrap | Dec 7, 1942 –Jun 23, 1945
| rowspan=3 | Elected in 1942 to finish Pittman's term.Died.

|- style="height:2em"
| 

|- style="height:2em"
| rowspan=3 
| rowspan=5 | 15
| rowspan=5 | Re-elected in 1944.

|- style="height:2em"
| colspan=3 | Vacant
| nowrap | Jun 23, 1945 –July 24, 1945
|  

|- style="height:2em"
! 10
| align=left | Edward P. Carville
|  | Democratic
| nowrap | July 24, 1945 –Jan 3, 1947
| Appointed to finish Scrugham's term.Lost nomination to full term.

|- style="height:2em"
! rowspan=9 | 11
| rowspan=9 align=left | George W. Malone
| rowspan=9  | Republican
| rowspan=9 nowrap | Jan 3, 1947 –Jan 3, 1959
| rowspan=3 | Elected in 1946.
| rowspan=3 | 15
| 

|- style="height:2em"
| 

|- style="height:2em"
| 
| rowspan=6 | 16
| rowspan=2 | Re-elected in 1950.Died.

|- style="height:2em"
| rowspan=6 | Re-elected in 1952.Lost re-election.
| rowspan=6 | 16
| rowspan=4 

|- style="height:2em"
|  
| nowrap | Sep 28, 1954 –Oct 1, 1954
| colspan=3 | Vacant

|- style="height:2em"
| Appointed to continue McCarran's term.Lost election to finish McCarran's term.
| nowrap | Oct 1, 1954 –Dec 1, 1954
|  | Republican
| align=right | Ernest S. Brown
! 7

|- style="height:2em"
| rowspan=2 | Elected in 1954 to finish McCarran's term.
| rowspan=11 nowrap | Dec 2, 1954 –Dec 17, 1974
| rowspan=11  | Democratic
| rowspan=11 align=right | Alan Bible
! rowspan=11 | 8

|- style="height:2em"
| 

|- style="height:2em"
| 
| rowspan=3 | 17
| rowspan=3 | Elected in 1956 to full term.

|- style="height:2em"
! rowspan=13 | 12
| rowspan=13 align=left | Howard Cannon
| rowspan=13  | Democratic
| rowspan=13 nowrap | Jan 3, 1959 –Jan 3, 1983
| rowspan=3 | Elected in 1958.
| rowspan=3 | 17
| 

|- style="height:2em"
| 

|- style="height:2em"
| 
| rowspan=3 | 18
| rowspan=3 | Re-elected in 1962.

|- style="height:2em"
| rowspan=3 | Re-elected in 1964.
| rowspan=3 | 18
| 

|- style="height:2em"
| 

|- style="height:2em"
| 
| rowspan=4 | 19
| rowspan=3 | Re-elected in 1968.Retired, then resigned earlyto give successor preferential seniority.

|- style="height:2em"
| rowspan=4 | Re-elected in 1970.
| rowspan=4 | 19
| 

|- style="height:2em"
| rowspan=2 

|- style="height:2em"
| Appointed early to finish Bible's term, having already been elected to the next term.
| rowspan=7 nowrap | Dec 18, 1974 –Jan 3, 1987
| rowspan=7  | Republican
| rowspan=7 align=right | Paul Laxalt
! rowspan=7 | 9

|- style="height:2em"
| 
| rowspan=3 | 20
| rowspan=3 | Elected in 1974.

|- style="height:2em"
| rowspan=3 | Re-elected in 1976.Lost re-election.
| rowspan=3 | 20
| 

|- style="height:2em"
| 

|- style="height:2em"
| 
| rowspan=3 | 21
| rowspan=3 | Re-elected in 1980.Retired.

|- style="height:2em"
! rowspan=3 | 13
| rowspan=3 align=left | Chic Hecht
| rowspan=3  | Republican
| rowspan=3 nowrap | Jan 3, 1983 –Jan 3, 1989
| rowspan=3 | Elected in 1982.Lost re-election.
| rowspan=3 | 21
| 

|- style="height:2em"
| 

|- style="height:2em"
| 
| rowspan=3 | 22
| rowspan=3 | Elected in 1986.
| rowspan=17 nowrap | Jan 3, 1987 –Jan 3, 2017
| rowspan=17  | Democratic
| rowspan=17 align=right | Harry Reid
! rowspan=17 | 10

|- style="height:2em"
! rowspan=6 | 14
| rowspan=6 align=left | Richard Bryan
| rowspan=6  | Democratic
| rowspan=6 nowrap | Jan 3, 1989 –Jan 3, 2001
| rowspan=3 | Elected in 1988.
| rowspan=3 | 22
| 

|- style="height:2em"
| 

|- style="height:2em"
| 
| rowspan=3 | 23
| rowspan=3 | Re-elected in 1992.

|- style="height:2em"
| rowspan=3 | Re-elected in 1994.Retired.
| rowspan=3 | 23
| 

|- style="height:2em"
| 

|- style="height:2em"
| 
| rowspan=3 | 24
| rowspan=3 | Re-elected in 1998.

|- style="height:2em"
! rowspan=6 | 15
| rowspan=6 align=left | John Ensign
| rowspan=6  | Republican
| rowspan=6 nowrap | Jan 3, 2001 –May 3, 2011
| rowspan=3 | Elected in 2000.
| rowspan=3 | 24
| 

|- style="height:2em"
| 

|- style="height:2em"
| 
| rowspan=3 | 25
| rowspan=3 | Re-elected in 2004.

|- style="height:2em"
| rowspan=3 | Re-elected in 2006.Resigned.
| rowspan=5 | 25
| 

|- style="height:2em"
| 

|- style="height:2em"
| rowspan=3 
| rowspan=5 | 26
| rowspan=5 | Re-elected in 2010.Retired.

|- style="height:2em"
| colspan=3 | Vacant
| nowrap | May 3, 2011 –May 9, 2011
|  

|- style="height:2em"
! rowspan=4 | 16
| rowspan=4 align=left | Dean Heller
| rowspan=4  | Republican
| rowspan=4 | May 9, 2011 –Jan 3, 2019
| Appointed to finish Ensign's term.

|- style="height:2em"
| rowspan=3 | Elected in 2012 to a full term.Lost re-election.
| rowspan=3 | 26
| 

|- style="height:2em"
| 

|- style="height:2em"
| 
| rowspan=3 | 27
| rowspan=3 | Elected in 2016.
| rowspan=6 | Jan 3, 2017 –Present
| rowspan=6  | Democratic
| rowspan=6 align=right | Catherine Cortez Masto
! rowspan=6 | 11

|- style="height:2em"
! rowspan=3 | 17
| rowspan=3 align=left | Jacky Rosen
| rowspan=3  | Democratic
| rowspan=3 nowrap | Jan 3, 2019 –Present
| rowspan=3 | Elected in 2018.
| rowspan=3 | 27
| 

|- style="height:2em"
| 

|- style="height:2em"
| 
| rowspan=3 | 28
| rowspan=3 | Re-elected in 2022.

|- style="height:2em"
| rowspan=3 colspan=5 | To be determined in the 2024 election.
| rowspan=3| 28
| 

|- style="height:2em"
| 

|- style="height:2em"
| 
| 29
| colspan=5 | To be determined in the 2028 election.

See also

 United States congressional delegations from Nevada
 List of United States representatives from Nevada
 Elections in Nevada

References

 

 
United States senators
Nevada